Terror in the Skies is a four-part British/American television series which premiered in June 2013 on Channel 4 in the United Kingdom and on September 29, 2013 on the Smithsonian Channel. The show uses amateur video and photos as well as eyewitness accounts to investigate air disasters and the response to them to make flying safer. The series is produced by British production company Arrow Media for both the Smithsonian Channel and Channel 4.

The show takes different formats on each broadcaster. The British version is hosted by Professor Brendan Walker, while the American version does not feature a host and has a greater focus on user-generated content.

Episodes

International broadcast
In Australia, the series premiered on pay television on March 23, 2015 on National Geographic Channel and on free-to-air television on May 21, 2015 on the Seven Network.

References

External links
 
 

2010s American documentary television series
2013 American television series debuts
2013 American television series endings
2013 British television series debuts
2013 British television series endings
2010s British documentary television series
Smithsonian Channel original programming
Channel 4 documentaries
Documentary television series about aviation
English-language television shows